The 2013 New Zealand Derby was a horse race which took place at Ellerslie Racecourse on Saturday 2 March 2013. It was the 138th running of the New Zealand Derby, and it was won by Habibi. With Silent Achiever having won the race 12 months earlier, it was the first time in the history of the race that fillies have won the Derby two years in a row. The runner-up, Fix, is also a filly, and it was just the second time fillies have finished first and second in the race in more than half a century.

The race is also notable for being the fifth Derby win for jockey Vinnie Colgan - an all-time record for the race.

Habibi's Derby win came in just her seventh career start, and as part of her first racing campaign. She made her debut on her home track, Ruakaka, on October 17, winning over 1200m. A series of increasingly impressive wins followed, including a Group 2 double against males at Ellerslie Racecourse over the Christmas/New Year period. It was then that connections opted to target the Derby.

Although she had tasted defeat for the first time at her previous start, when a fast-finishing third in the Avondale Guineas, Habibi was the hot favourite in the Derby. She began well, but settled in about midfield as a strong pace was set by front-runner Castlzeberg. Habibi made her run early in the home straight, and she and Fix passed Castlzeberg together and drew away to fight out the finish. Though Fix resisted strongly all the way to the line, Habibi was able to edge away to win by half a length.

Race details
 Sponsor: TV3
 Prize money: NZ$750,000
 Track: Good
 Number of runners: 18
 Winner's time: 2:27.58

Full result

Winner's details
Further details of the winner, Habibi:

 Foaled: 4 September 2009 in New Zealand
 Sire: Ekraar; Dam: Danny Holiday (Danasinga)
 Owner: G P, H J & P J Crofskey & P A McIntyre
 Trainer: Donna & Dean Logan
 Breeder: H J & P J Crofskey
 Starts: 7
 Wins: 6
 Seconds: 0
 Thirds: 1
 Earnings: $602,575

The road to the Derby
Early-season appearances in 2012-13 prior to running in the Derby.

 Habibi – 1st Great Northern Guineas, 1st Championship Stakes, 3rd Avondale Guineas
 Fix – 3rd New Zealand 1000 Guineas, 1st Eight Carat Classic, 1st Royal Stakes, 1st Sir Tristram Fillies' Classic
 Castlzeberg – 1st Waikato Guineas, 2nd Avondale Guineas
 Saint Kitt - No stakes races
 Choice Bro – 1st Karaka Mile, 4th Avondale Guineas
 King Kamada – 3rd Championship Stakes Prelude
 Alert - No stakes races
 Zinko – 3rd Bonecrusher Stakes, 2nd Wellington Guineas, 8th Levin Classic, 2nd Waikato Guineas, 5th Avondale Guineas
 The Grinner – No stakes races
 Soriano – 4th Wellington Guineas, 6th New Zealand 1000 Guineas, 3rd Levin Classic, 1st Eulogy Stakes, 2nd Eight Carat Classic, 3rd Royal Stakes, 2nd Desert Gold Stakes, 2nd Sir Tristram Fillies' Classic
 Addictive Habit – 7th Hawke's Bay Guineas, 7th Levin Classic, 2nd Great Northern Guineas, 2nd Championship Stakes, 6th Waikato Guineas, 9th Championship Stakes
 Weissmuller – 1st Wellington Stakes, 9th Waikato Guineas, 7th Avondale Guineas
 Kidwelly – 5th Great Northern Guineas, 2nd Royal Stakes, 5th Karaka Mile, 4th Sir Tristram Fillies' Classic
 Deane Martin - 1st Championship Stakes Prelude, 6th Championship Stakes
 Corporal Lincoln - 9th Karaka Mile
 Solar Eclipse - 6th Championship Stakes Prelude, 3rd Championship Stakes, 8th Avondale Guineas
 Dubai Shuffle - 7th Karaka Mile
 Celtic Chief - 5th Waikato Guineas, 6th Avondale Guineas

Subsequent Group 1 wins
Subsequent wins at Group 1 level by runners in the 2013 New Zealand Derby.

 Soriano - Zabeel Classic, Herbie Dyke Stakes
 Addictive Habit - Livamol Classic
 Habibi - 2nd Northern Dancer Turf Stakes

See also

 2019 New Zealand Derby
 2018 New Zealand Derby
 2017 New Zealand Derby
 2016 New Zealand Derby
 2015 New Zealand Derby
 2014 New Zealand Derby
 2012 New Zealand Derby
 2011 New Zealand Derby
 2010 New Zealand Derby
  Recent winners of major NZ 3 year old races
 Desert Gold Stakes
 Hawke's Bay Guineas
 Karaka Million
 Levin Classic
 New Zealand 1000 Guineas
 New Zealand 2000 Guineas
 New Zealand Oaks

New Zealand Derby
2013 in New Zealand sport
New Zealand Derby
March 2013 sports events in New Zealand